Asia Hogan-Rochester (born April 20, 1999) is a Canadian rugby sevens player. She won a gold medal at the 2019 Pan American Games as a member of the Canada women's national rugby sevens team. After the win over the United States she said that "It's unreal, I can't believe this has happened. This was our biggest opponent so we were a bit (nervous). But we definitely used those nerves coming into this final and we came out on top thankfully." Hogan-Rochester plays in primarily the wing or fullback positions.

References

1999 births
Living people
Canada international rugby sevens players
Female rugby sevens players
Pan American Games gold medalists for Canada
Pan American Games medalists in rugby sevens
Rugby sevens players at the 2019 Pan American Games
Sportspeople from Toronto
Medalists at the 2019 Pan American Games
Canada international women's rugby sevens players